Boris Popovic may refer to:

 Boris Popovich (1896-1943), Russian football midfielder
 Boris Popovič (born 1962), Slovene politician
 Boris Popović (born 2000), Serbian football defender